Mordialloc is a beachside suburb in Melbourne, Victoria, Australia, 24 km south-east of Melbourne's Central Business District, located within the City of Kingston local government area.

History

Originally "Moody Yallock", the name is derived from the term moordy yallock which originated from the Aboriginal language Boonwurrung, in which "yallock" means "creek" or "water", and is listed in some sources as meaning muddy creek, and in others as "little sea." from c.1850 was the site of the Mordialloc Aboriginal Reserve.

Mordialloc Post Office opened on 17 October 1863. In 1995 it was renamed Braeside Business Centre, and a new Mordialloc office opened near the railway station.

In the 1970s, a green ban imposed by the Builders Labourers Federation stopped a Coles Supermarket being built that would result in the eviction and destruction of several homes.

The namesaked Mordialloc Creek is arguably the most significant feature of the suburb. Home to Pompei's boat works, Mordialloc Creek has a rich history of traditional wooden boat building. Many classic boats line the banks of the creek. The creek mouth section below Nepean Highway is also home to the Mordialloc Motor Yacht Club and Mordialloc Sailing Club, and the creek drains into the Beaumaris Bay flanked by the Mordialloc Pier.

On 8 June 2018, a pilot of a Moorabbin-bound light plane, Cessna 172 (VH-EWE), died when his plane crashed and burst into flames in a street in Mordialloc. ATC recordings indicated he had an engine failure on approach.

Transport
 Mordialloc railway station is on the Frankston railway line.
 Moorabbin Airport is just located next door
 Bus routes 903, 708, 902, 709, 705 pass/start in Mordialloc

Schools
 Mordialloc College – Mordialloc
 Mordialloc Beach Primary School – Mordialloc
 St Brigids Mordialloc

Sport

The suburb has an Australian rules team competing in the Southern Football League.
 
Golfers play at the Woodlands Golf Club on White Street, Mordialloc.

The Epsom Park Horse Racing track was situated in Mordialloc.  Now a housing estate, in its heyday at the beginning of the 20th century it was one of Victoria's premier race tracks.  Later in life it became a training track before being eventually closed in the 1980s. In 2008, Doug Denyer Reserve, situated in Epsom Park hosted it first ever cricket season with Mordialloc Redbacks being the home team, Redbacks being a part of the Mordialloc Cricket Club. The Redbacks first Junior Head Coach at Epsom Park was David Beckett.

The suburb has a social baseball team, the Mordialloc Ducks Baseball Club, competing in the Dandenong Baseball Association in winter and the Victorian Baseball Summer League in summer. They play at the Kingston Heath Reserve in Cheltenham, where the grounds are primarily used by the Cheltenham Baseball Club.

Walking/cycling trails

There are numerous walking/cycling trails in Mordialloc, including the:
 Long Beach Trail from the Patterson River to the Mordialloc Pier.
 Bay Trail from Seaford to Port Melbourne.
 Mordialloc Creek Trail from the Mordialloc Pier to Aspendale Gardens.
 Numerous 'desire paths' (or goat tracks) that run next to the Mordialloc Creek between the Wells Road bridge and the Boat Ramp near Chute Street.

Notable locals
 Scott Boland, test cricketer
 Geoffrey Connard AM, politician
 "Smacka" Fitzgibbon, entertainer
 Mary Hannay Foott, author
 Winnie George cricketer
 George Hanlon, horse trainer
 Janine Ilitch netball player
 Julius Herz, musician
 Jack Holt, a horse trainer known as the "Wizard of Mordialloc"
 Cecilia John, singer and social activist
 George Furner Langley, soldier and teacher
 Katie Loynes footballer, teacher
 Daniel Mackinnon, pastoralist
 Rex Mortimer, solicitor and academic
 Sir Murray Tyrrell, public servant
 Tim Richardson (politician)
 Bill Templeton, politician
 Bill Williamson, jockey
 Tommy Woodcock, horse trainer
 Lorraine Wreford politician

Gallery

See also
 City of Mordialloc – Mordialloc was previously within this former local government area.
 Electoral district of Mordialloc

References

External links
Australian Places –  Mordialloc

Suburbs of Melbourne
Suburbs of the City of Kingston (Victoria)
Green bans
Port Phillip